Harold "Chuck" Willis (January 31, 1926 – April 10, 1958) was an American blues, rhythm and blues, and rock and roll singer and songwriter. His biggest hits, "C. C. Rider" (1957) and "What Am I Living For" (1958), both reached No.1 on the Billboard R&B chart.  He was known as The King of the Stroll for his performance of the 1950s dance the stroll.

Life and career
Willis was born in Atlanta, Georgia, in 1926. He was spotted at a talent contest by Atlanta radio disc jockey Zenas Sears, who became his manager and helped him to sign with Columbia Records in 1951. After one single, Willis began recording on a Columbia subsidiary, Okeh. During his stay at Okeh, he established himself as a popular R&B singer and songwriter, performing material that he wrote himself. In 1956, he moved to Atlantic Records where he had immediate success with "It's Too Late", "Juanita" and "Love Me Cherry".

His most successful recording was "C.C. Rider", which topped the US Billboard R&B chart in 1957 and also crossed over and sold well in the pop market. Jerry Wexler said it was Willis's surprising idea to "do an old standard" instead of one of his own songs. "C.C. Rider" was a remake of a twelve-bar blues, performed by Ma Rainey in Atlanta before Willis was born. Its relaxed beat, combined with a mellow vibraphone backing and chorus, inspired the emergence of the popular dance, The Stroll. When performing on stage Willis and his group would do this step side to side. Dick Clark played "C. C. Rider" on American Bandstand, and "The Stroll" became a popular dance. Willis's follow-up was "Betty and Dupree", another "stroll" song and a similar "old standard", which also did well. Wexler said that Dick Clark used "Betty and Dupree" on American Bandstand to accompany "The Stroll," and that is how Willis became known as "King of The Stroll." Willis' single "Going to the River", a song by Dave Bartholomew and Fats Domino, was a prototype for his "stroll" sound, reaching No.4 on the R&B chart.

Willis performed wearing a turban (a gimmick suggested to him by his friend Screamin' Jay Hawkins) and was also known as the "Sheik of Shake." In the early 1950s he hosted and performed on a weekly Saturday night television show in Atlanta, which featured guest artists such as Ray Charles and Sam Cooke who were passing through town. Zenas Sears said that Willis was a better songwriter than a performer, but also said, "On the TV show ... Chuck would do five or six different numbers every week. He moved very well, he handled himself very well and put everyone at ease." He was a solid, if not spectacular, performer on the road as well, and "was one of the few artists who would treat a band properly," according to Roy Gaines, who was Willis's bandleader and guitarist.

Songwriting
Willis approached songwriting with painstaking craftsmanship and the result was literate, soulful and melancholy. He did not introduce a song in the studio until it was a polished product and fully worked out in his mind. He used a variety of methods. Zenas Sears said Willis would drive around in the car singing into a reel-to-reel tape recorder. Sears said, "If he'd lived he would have been recognized for that [his songwriting]." Roy Gaines recalled, "He'd lock up in a hotel room and wouldn't see anyone for 3-4 days or a week. When he wrote 'It's Too Late,' he was in his room for a week."

Ruth Brown, who toured with Willis, said he would write on yellow legal pads. Brown said, "I asked him, because he had such a good song going, I said, 'Chuck, why don't you write me a tune? And he did. He wrote, "Oh What a Dream".'" Jerry Wexler said Willis would bring a full set of lyrics into the studio and then work out the arrangements with the band. Zenas Sears said, "[N]o one helped him with his songs. He always wrote a great deal."

Death
Willis had suffered from stomach ulcers for many years. He was known to drink a lot. During surgery in Chicago, Willis died of peritonitis on April 10, 1958, at the age of 32.

His untimely death occurred while at the peak of his career, just after the release of his last single, "What Am I Living For", backed by "Hang Up My Rock and Roll Shoes". "Hang Up My Rock & Roll Shoes" was actually the A-side of the single but, upon his death, "What Am I Living For" became the more popular of the two songs. "What Am I Living For" sold over one million copies, and was awarded a gold disc. It was also the top R&B disc of 1958. This was the first rock and roll record released in stereo, "engineered by Tom Dowd of Atlantic Records".

When Willis died, he owed a lot of money to the US government, because, according to Zenas Sears, "he paid the band out of his own pocket without ever deducting taxes. ... When he died, his wife had the house, she had the fur coats and the Cadillac, but there was no money."

Influence
An early Okeh hit, "Don't Deceive Me (Please Don't Go)" became his most widely covered song with versions by Ruth Brown, Little Richard, Screamin' Jay Hawkins, James Brown, and Delaney and Bonnie.  It was also used as the title of an episode of "Grey's Anatomy" (Season 7, episode 13, 2011).

His hit, the blues ballad "It's Too Late" was covered by other artists, including Otis Redding, Roy Orbison, Buddy Holly and the Crickets, Ted Taylor (1969 single),  Freddie King, Derek and the Dominos and the Jerry Garcia Band. In 2005, Redding's version was heavily sampled by Kanye West on Late Registration'''s "Gone".

Elvis Presley covered "I Feel So Bad" and "C. C. Rider." The Five Keys and Peaches and Herb had hits with "Close Your Eyes", and Ruth Brown and Conway Twitty had hits with "Oh What a Dream".

The Band covered "Hang Up My Rock and Roll Shoes" on their 1972 live album Rock of Ages''.

Willis's cousin was Chick Willis.

Discography

Singles

Albums

Compilation albums

References

1926 births
1958 deaths
Musicians from Atlanta
American rhythm and blues singers
Deaths from peritonitis
Atlantic Records artists
20th-century American singers
20th-century American male singers
Okeh Records artists
Burials at South-View Cemetery